Pareiorhaphis hystrix is a species of catfish in the family Loricariidae. It is native to South America, where it is known only from Brazil, with its type locality being listed as the Dos Touros River basin in the state of Rio Grande do Sul. The species reaches 11.5 cm (4.5 inches) in standard length and is believed to be a facultative air-breather.

References 

Fish described in 2002
Catfish of South America
Fish of Brazil
Loricariidae